Leonard is an unincorporated community in the southeastern corner of Tulsa County, Oklahoma, United States. The population at the 2020 U.S. Census was 262, compared to 200 in the 2010 census. It is located on U.S. Route 64 at the Wagoner County line. The town serves the surrounding farming area. It is notable for the presence of the nearby Leonard Geophysical Observatory.

Demographics

History 
The post office was established August 22, 1908. by L.E. Reynolds and named for S. C. Leonard of Detroit, Michigan. Joe Randolph was the first postmaster.

Leonard Geophysical Observatory
The Oklahoma Geological Survey's Leonard Geophysical Observatory is just south of Leonard. The Oklahoma Geological Survey has announced its decision to close the facility permanently. This facility was established in 1960, because it was "seismically quiet," making it a satisfactory place for monitoring underground nuclear tests. The facility had been built in 1960 by Jersey Production Company (a subsidiary of Standard Oil Company of New Jersey) for seismic research. Jersey Company gave it to Oklahoma University in 1965. A  site near Leonard was purchased by Sarkis Foundation and given to the State of Oklahoma. In 1978, the observatory became part of the Oklahoma Geological Survey. It was soon named the "Oklahoma Geological Survey Observatory."

Under the Threshold Test Ban Treaty, which President George H. W. Bush and Mikhil Gorbachev signed in 1990, the Russian Government was permitted to monitor American underground nuclear tests. Leonard was one of three locations that the Russians were allowed to use for this purpose. The Russians were allowed to build a seismograph station on leased ground adjacent to the OGSO, which they returned to Oklahoma after completing their mission seven years later.

The observatory employs a staff of two, and has been involved in monitoring earthquakes in the vicinity of Oklahoma since it opened. However, Austin Holland, state seismologist, has said that it is technologically obsolete and that the work can be done in the main OGS office at the OU campus in Norman. He added that the estimated cost to upgrade the Leonard facility is about $100,000. The state will close it during the summer of 2015, though the date has not been determined. The two staffers have been offered jobs in Norman, according to Holland.

External links
"Cities/Towns of Tulsa County, Oklahoma" 
Lawson, James E., "History of the Oklahoma Geological Survey Observatory near Leonard, OK." Tulsa World. Accessed April 29, 2015 Accessed August 17, 2015.

References

Unincorporated communities in Tulsa County, Oklahoma
Unincorporated communities in Oklahoma